American country music singer Steve Azar has released seven studio albums, thirteen singles, and seven music videos. Azar debuted in 1996 with the album Heartbreak Town on the now defunct River North Records, which charted two of its three singles on Billboard Hot Country Songs in 1996. 2002's Waitin' on Joe, released on Mercury Records, accounted for his highest-charting single, "I Don't Have to Be Me ('til Monday)", which went to number 2 on Hot Country Songs and number 35 on the Billboard Hot 100 that year. Only one other single, the title track, charted from this project. After being sidelined with a cyst on his vocal cords, he charted his last Mercury release "Doin' It Right" in 2005.

All of Azar's subsequent albums have been released independently, first on Dang Records and then on Ride Records. His independent releases are Indianola (2008), Slide On Over Here (2009), Delta Soul: Volume 1 (2011), Down at the Liquor Store (2017), and My Mississippi Reunion (2020). Slide On Over Here charted additional top-40 Hot Country Songs entries in "Moo La Moo" and "Sunshine (Everybody Needs a Little)". Down at the Liquor Store was recorded in collaboration with various backing musicians for B. B. King and Elvis Presley, and was credited to Steve Azar and the King's Men.

Studio albums

Singles

Notes
A^ "Someday" also peaked at number 65 on the RPM Country Tracks chart in Canada.

Other charted songs

Music videos

References

Country music discographies
Discographies of American artists